Algonquin Township is located in McHenry County, Illinois, with the township office in the city of Crystal Lake. As of the 2020 census, its population was 87,633 and it contained 33,960 housing units. It is the largest township by population in McHenry County. Communities located within the township include Algonquin, Barrington Hills, Cary, Crystal Lake, Fox River Grove, Lake in the Hills, Port Barrington, Lakewood, Oakwood Hills, and Trout Valley.

Geography

Demographics

References

External links
 
City-data.com
Illinois State Archives

Townships in McHenry County, Illinois
Algonquin, Illinois
Townships in Illinois